The 2004 Barnsley Metropolitan Borough Council election took place on 10 June 2004 to elect members of Barnsley Metropolitan Borough Council in South Yorkshire, England. The whole council was up for election with boundary changes since the last election in 2003 reducing the number of seats by 3. The Labour party stayed in overall control of the council.

Election result

This resulted in the following composition of the council:

Ward results

References

2004 English local elections
2004
2000s in South Yorkshire